Laudianism was an early seventeenth-century reform movement within the Church of England, promulgated by Archbishop William Laud and his supporters. It rejected the predestination upheld by the previously dominant Calvinism in favour of free will, and hence the possibility of salvation for all men. It is probably best known for its impact on the Anglican high church movement and its emphasis on liturgical ceremony and clerical hierarchy. Laudianism was the culmination of the move towards Arminianism in the Church of England, but was neither purely theological in nature, nor restricted to the English church.

Theology

The Elizabethan Settlement of 1559, which set the tone for English religious policy until the rise of Laudianism, was theologically a mixture of Catholic doctrine, Calvinism and some minor elements from Lutheranism, without officially adhering to any one of them. Although the doctrine of predestination was to be handled with care at a parish level in order to offset despair and the ensuing disobedience, the seventeenth of the Thirty-Nine Articles sets out a doctrine of predestination to life as one of the founding principles of the English Church but omits reference to reprobation. Unlike Calvin's and Beza's own doctrine on predestination, which is supra-lapsarian, double and unconditional, the more usual opinion among the Reformed was sub- or infra-lapsarian which viewed God's predestination as acting on human beings considered as those already created and fallen, so that reprobation was judicial. The essence of Laudianism in a theological sense was a belief in God's grace and universal atonement and the free will of all men to obtain salvation. Thus, various Reformed theories of predestination were rejected, and predestination was based on God's foresight of who would believe (conditional election). In addition, Laud's insistence on uniformity in ritual aroused great opposition from the Puritans.

Laudianism in practice
In practice, this led to a polarization within English Protestantism, to the extent that the movements of Laudianism and Puritanism could no longer be described under this all-encompassing banner. Predestination had been a unifying feature of the Reformed Church and, although more radical groups might have been rejected, there was still a sense of brotherhood among the adherents of supra- and infra- approaches.  Archbishop Laud disagreed with the views of his predecessors, such as John Whitgift, that Puritans were aberrant brethren, erring but deserving some level of leniency; instead he believed that the Protestant non-conformists presented a direct threat to the establishment and that there was more common ground between his own, true position and that of the pre-Reformed Roman Catholic Church.  

The 1633 edition of the standard Latin-English Dictionary, dedicated to William Laud, contained for the first time the word Praedestinatiani, who were defined as "a kind of heretic that held fatal predestination of every particular matter person or action, and that all things come to passe, and fell out necessarily; especially touching the salvation and damnation of particular men".

Following the royal marriage negotiations with Spain, James I faced an upsurge in hostility from the pulpit and the press. Although the King tried to quiet such opposition through proclamations, the confinement of offenders and a set of Directions to Preachers in 1622, opposition came from senior figures within the established Church, such as several royal chaplains, Dean Sutcliffe of Exeter, Archdeacon Hakewill of Surrey and George Abbot, Archbishop of Canterbury. From this it can be seen that Laudianism signalled a stark break with previous practices and perceptions within the Elizabethan and early Stuart Church. Indeed, James reacted to this episode by moving his support to anti-Calvinist churchmen such as Lancelot Andrewes at Winchester dioceses and Montaigne at London dioceses, and at last elevating Laud to the episcopate, thus radically shifting the power-base in favour of the emerging movement.  

Charles I took these personnel changes even further when Laud was promised the archbishopric of Canterbury and effectively became the religious spokesman for the regime. As bishop of London, he had been controlling the printing presses since 1628 and prohibiting discussion of predestination. The York primacy had been filled with a succession of Laudians since the death of Calvinist Matthews in 1628 and from 1632 it was occupied by Neile, the one-time mentor of William Laud. In 1628, the Duke of Buckingham was made Chancellor of Cambridge University and all predestinarian teaching was subsequently banned. This was supported by a royal proclamation which effectively outlawed Calvinism on a national level.

There was also a break with the previous practices of the early Stuart Church on a visual level. Upon his translation to the bishopric of Durham in 1617, Richard Neile had the communion table transformed into an altar at the east end of the cathedral and supported Laud (then under his patronage) in a similar action at the dioceses of Gloucester.

In the 1630s, Laud declared that "the altar is the greatest place of God's residence upon earth, greater than the pulpit for there it is Hoc est corpus meum, This is my body; but in the other it is at most but Hoc est verbum meum, This is my word." In November 1633, by act of Privy Council King Charles I established the precedent that all parochial churches should follow the by then general cathedral practice of placing communion tables altar-wise at the east end of chancels. This was highly significant. One of the main points of the Reformation had been the replacement of the Catholic teaching that salvation necessarily came from the Church through the sacraments of communion, baptism and confession. These rites were also maintained in the Protestant churches. The visual emphasis that this placed on the Real Presence and the Eucharist aligned with the Lutheran practice of maintaining intact medieval altars and pieces of art, though not with the Calvinist emphasis of having the pulpit at the centre, which emphasized the importance of communicating the Gospel through preaching. Similarly, a few years later, Bishops Overall and Andrewes could be seen advocating the practice of confession before receiving Holy Communion, a practice present in the Lutheran Churches, but not in Reformed Christianity.

Laudianism and the English Civil War
The 1630s saw a polarization of religious opinion influenced by reactions to tracts, sermons and lobbying; the revolutionary events in Scotland; the Thirty Years War; and the level of ecclesiastical corruption revealed by the Houses of Parliament's inquiries. Similarly, in relation to the attacks on government officials, apart from those directed towards the great men of the state, the harrying of Laudian churchmen was positively gleeful.  

After 1640, the Laudians and Arminians, who had previously enjoyed the favour of the episcopal hierarchy, found themselves under attack from both the Parliament and the press. The Constitutions and Canons Ecclesiasticall were passed by the 1640 Convocation, unusually remaining in session after the Short Parliament was dissolved. They included as canon VI what became notorious as the "et cetera oath", a pledge to uphold episcopacy and the current Anglican hierarchy.

Priests and bishops who had gathered in Convocation to draft the canons of 1640 made high claims for the ceremonies and rites of the Established Church but, within months, were unable to enforce them. By December 1640 thirteen bishops had been impeached, with another dozen having followed them by December 1641. Within eight weeks of the opening of Parliament, the Houses were calling not for the restoration of the pre-Laudian church, along Elizabethan or Jacobean lines, but the abolition of the entire ecclesiastical order and its reconstruction in a Puritan mould. The removal of ecclesiastical judges and the abolition of the High Commission meant that the Established Church was unprotected on a parish level.  Prayer books and surplices were torn up; communion tables were relocated and altar rails were burned. The re-establishment of the Anglican Church, in its Laudian version, would not occur until the Restoration in 1660.

See also
Arminianism in the Church of England

References

Citations

Sources

}

17th-century Protestantism
Christian theological movements
History of the Church of England
Arminianism